Joe Tamani is a Fijian rugby league footballer who represented Fiji in the 2000 World Cup.

Playing career
Tamani played for the Bradford Bulls in 1996's Super League I, before signing for new Australasian Super League franchise the Adelaide Rams in 1997. He was part of their inaugural side on 1 March against the North Queensland Cowboys and remained with the squad during the 1998 season. Tamani became a favourite of the Adelaide crowd and scored six tries in his 21 games for the ill-fated club which was shut down only weeks before the 1999 NRL season.

Tamani first represented Fiji in 1996 and in 2000 Tamani was selected as part Fiji's World Cup squad.

In 2000, Tamani was playing for the Cabramatta Two Blues.

References

Living people
Fijian rugby league players
Fiji national rugby league team players
1972 births
Bradford Bulls players
Adelaide Rams players
Rugby league wingers
Rugby league centres
Rugby league second-rows
Cabramatta Two Blues players